Jean René Labat (19 February 1892 – 8 March 1970) was a French high jumper. He competed at the 1920 Summer Olympics and finished in ninth place.

References

People from Hendaye
1892 births
1970 deaths
French male high jumpers
Olympic athletes of France
Athletes (track and field) at the 1920 Summer Olympics
Sportspeople from Pyrénées-Atlantiques